Flockton Green is a hamlet in the civil parish of Kirkburton, in the Kirklees district, in the county of West Yorkshire, England. It is immediately east of Flockton village, on the junction of the road from Overton with the A637 road between Grange Moor and West Bretton and close to the border of Kirklees and Wakefield districts. Flockton Green has a pub called The George and Dragon.

History 
Flockton Green was formerly called "Nether Flockton". Flockton Green has a pub called The George and Dragon. It is recorded as having a population of 800 in 1809. Plans were approved for Flockton Green Working Men's club (in Flockton itself) to be turned into 87 new homes in 2016.

References

Hamlets in West Yorkshire
Kirkburton